Oud Sluis is a defunct restaurant in Sluis, Netherlands. It was a fine dining restaurant that had been awarded one or more Michelin stars since 1995. It carried one star in the period 1995–1998, two stars in the period 1999–2005 and three stars from 2006.

The chef was Sergio Herman.

The restaurant appeared from 2003 in the list of The S.Pellegrino World's 50 Best Restaurants. In its first ranking it was placed 40th, the ranking for 2011 was 17th.

Since 2008 they have also run a guest house, Casa Chico y Luna, in Sint Anna ter Muiden.

In June 2013, Sergio Herman announced the closure of the restaurant by the end of 2013 to focus on his other projects. He also wants to spend more time with his wife and 4 children. The restaurant finally closed down on 22 December 2013.

Awards
 Michelin Guide – one to three stars since 1995
 World's 50 Best Restaurants – placed 45th to 17th since 2003
 Verybest.com – Very Best Restaurant 2010
 Lekker.nl – Best Dutch Restaurant 2004–2006, 2008–2010
 Gault Millau – 20 points (out of 20) in 2010 and 2011; 19.5 points (out of 20) in 2008 and 2009,

See also
 List of Michelin three starred restaurants
 List of Michelin starred restaurants in the Netherlands

References

External links
Sergio Herman | Oud Sluis

Restaurants in the Netherlands
Defunct restaurants in the Netherlands
Michelin Guide starred restaurants in the Netherlands
Restaurants in Zeeland
Sluis
Restaurants established in 1990
Restaurants disestablished in 2013
1990 establishments in the Netherlands
Dutch companies disestablished in 2013
Dutch companies established in 1990
20th-century architecture in the Netherlands